The 1947 Italian Grand Prix was a Grand Prix motor race held in Portello district on 7 September 1947.

Entries

Classification

Qualifying

Race

References

Session results taken from:
 
 
 

Italian Grand Prix
Italian Grand Prix
Grand Prix